Kenneth Rush (September 14, 1931 – October 17, 2011) was a NASCAR Cup Series driver whose career spanned from 1957 to 1972.

Career
He would win the 1969 'Bama 400 Grand Touring race on Saturday, September 13, 1969 - arguably the first race held at Talladega Superspeedway sanctioned by any motorsports body - in his Chevrolet Camaro. Another notable appearance for Rush was at the 1957 Rebel 300 where he finished in last place due to the infamous "lap 29" crash.

He started 14th on average and finished in 18th on average. After his racing career was over, Rush managed to earn $11,760 in total prize winnings ($ when adjusted for inflation). Had he been born 40 years later, he may have accomplished the big prize winnings that today's NASCAR superstars earn from their races. A lot of the races during Ken's era paid $200 ($ when adjusted for inflation) or less just for winning the race.

Ken died from a stroke in his hometown of High Point, North Carolina at age 80.

References

External links
 

1931 births
2011 deaths
NASCAR drivers
Sportspeople from High Point, North Carolina
Racing drivers from North Carolina